is a Japanese manga series written by Eiji Nonaka and illustrated by Maru Asakura. It was serialized in Kodansha's shōnen manga magazine Weekly Shōnen Magazine from July 2009 to October 2011, with its chapters collected in six tankōbon volumes. A four-minute-long 11-episode anime adaptation, produced by DLE, was broadcast on Nippon TV as part of their  program from from June and September 2011.

Plot
In a school where after-school activities are mandatory for all students, Hajime and her friend Sayo come across a club that they have never seen before: the Cultural Activity Preservation Club. Members make handicrafts, such as mats and toothpicks, using traditional methods.

Characters

Traditional Art Inheritance Club

Hajime is a new club member.

Sayo is Hajime's close friend. However, she has not yet joined the traditional art inheritance club.

Aya is the vice-president of the traditional art inheritance club. She has written a text of the omikuji.

Maria, often referred to as 'Tsumayōji-san' by other members, is a senior of the club. She has carved a groove of the toothpick.

Ema is a senior of the club, and is a successor of the rain gutter artisan.

Ichirō is the president of Nagashima High School's traditional art inheritance club. He is Toba Sōjō's descendant, and has succeeded to Chōjū-giga.

Shizuma is a trainer of the varied tit.

Manzai Study Group

Françoise is the president of the manzai study group.

Members' Family

Yutaka is Ichirō's younger sister.

Media

Manga
Written by Eiji Nonaka and illustrated by Maru Asakura, Double-J was serialized in Kodansha's shōnen manga magazine Weekly Shōnen Magazine from July 22, 2009, to October 26, 2011. Kodansha collected its chapters in six tankōbon volumes, released from January 15, 2010, to December 16, 2011.

Anime
A four-minute-long 11-episode anime adaptation, produced by DLE and directed by Azuma Tani, was broadcast on Nippon TV's Flash-animated shorts program  from June 29 to September 14, 2011.

Episode list

References

External links 
 Official manga website 
 

Comedy anime and manga
Anime series based on manga
Kodansha manga
Nippon TV original programming
School life in anime and manga
Shōnen manga